Vanja Radinović (born 7 September 1972) is a Serbian football manager and former player.

Playing career
After coming through the youth system at Partizan, Radinović played for OFK Beograd between 1992 and 1996.

Managerial career
Between 2011 and 2012, Radinović served as assistant manager to Aleksandar Stanojević and Avram Grant at Partizan.

In April 2015, Radinović was hired as manager of Romanian club Ceahlăul Piatra Neamț, replacing the dismissed Zé Maria.

In January 2017, Radinović took charge of Slovenian club Rudar Velenje.

References

External links
 

1972 births
Living people
Footballers from Split, Croatia
Serbs of Croatia
Yugoslav footballers
Serbia and Montenegro footballers
Serbian footballers
Association football defenders
OFK Beograd players
First League of Serbia and Montenegro players
Serbian football managers
FK Bežanija managers
CSM Ceahlăul Piatra Neamț managers
NK Rudar Velenje managers
FK Partizan non-playing staff
Liga I managers
Serbian expatriate football managers
Expatriate football managers in Romania
Expatriate football managers in Greece
Expatriate football managers in Slovenia
Serbian expatriate sportspeople in Romania
Serbian expatriate sportspeople in Greece
Serbian expatriate sportspeople in Slovenia